The Platinum Collection is a compilation album by English boy band Take That. The album itself is a boxed collection of expanded editions of the band's first three albums, Take That & Party, Everything Changes and Nobody Else.

Background
The album peaked at number 127 on the UK Albums Chart. The collection sold steadily over time and has received a sales certification in the UK of Silver, meaning 60,000 copies have been sold.

Track listing
 Disc 1 – Take That & Party

 Disc 2 – Everything Changes

 Disc 3 – Nobody Else

Certifications

References

Take That albums
2006 compilation albums